New Eden is a Canadian television mockumentary series, created by and starring Evany Rosen and Kayla Lorette. The series centres on Grace Lee (Rosen) and Katherine Wryfield (Lorette), the leaders of an all-female cult compound, through the narrative frame of a fictional true crime documentary series profiling the cult's descent into chaos and murder. The first season was directed by Aleysa Young.

The first season was released on the Crave streaming service on December 31, 2019, one day ahead of the promoted release date of January 1, 2020.

Season one

References

External links
 Crave TV web page
 

2010s Canadian sitcoms
2019 Canadian television series debuts
English-language television shows
Television series by Bell Media
Television shows filmed in Ontario
Canadian comedy web series
Crave original programming
Television series about cults
Canadian mockumentary television series